Samoana diaphana, one of several species also known as the Moorean viviparous tree snail or the Polynesian tree snail, is a species of tropical, air-breathing land snail, a terrestrial, pulmonate, gastropod mollusk in the family Partulidae. This species is endemic to French Polynesia.

References

External links

D
Fauna of French Polynesia
Molluscs of Oceania
Endangered fauna of Oceania
Gastropods described in 1953
Taxonomy articles created by Polbot